Unwind is a 2007 dystopian novel by young adult literature author Neal Shusterman. It takes place in the United States in the near future. After the Second Civil War, which was labeled "The Heartland War", was fought over abortion, a compromise was reached, allowing parents to sign an order for their children between the ages of 13 and 18 to be "unwound" — taken to "harvest camps" and dissected into their body parts for later use. The reasoning is that, since 99.44% of the body is used, unwinds do not technically die because their individual body parts live on.

Unwind received positive reviews upon release, with praise focusing on the novel's immersive environment and sociological implications. It received the Best Book for Young Adults award. A film adaptation of Unwind was in production, but Shusterman announced in January 2020 that a television series would be developed instead. A second novel titled UnWholly was released in August 2012, a third titled UnSouled in December 2013, and a fourth titled UnDivided in October 2014. A novella, UnStrung, was also published. UnBound is the most recent addition to the Unwind series and was written by Shusterman, Michelle Knowlden, Jarrod Shusterman, Terry Black, and Brendan Shusterman. It was published December 15, 2015, by Simon & Schuster and is a collection of novellas that explore the secrets and lost stories of the Unwind world.

Summary

Synopsis 
In a near-future dystopian United States, the conflict between the pro-choice and pro-life movements escalated into a second civil war. In response, the government fought against both sides to stop the war from escalating and closed down schools and other services for children in order to do so. Children, teenagers, and young adults began protesting and rioting against the actions and nearly toppled the government in an event known as the Teen Uprising. At the same time, technology in organ transplants advanced into a process known as "unwinding"; organs and body parts can be harvested from any acceptable body and used by other bodies without rejection.

As a way to end the war, the government passed a set of amendments known as The Bill of Life. Abortion is banned, "storking" (the act of abandoning newborn babies to be left in someone else's care) becomes an accepted practice, and the Unwind Accord allows families to have their children between ages of 13 and 18 undergo unwinding as an option. Unwinding is justified as legal because the patient is kept alive during the entire process and roughly 99% of the body is harvested. Many parents use it to get rid of unwanted children who have reached their teenage years.

Plot Summary 
The story centers around three teenagers who have been scheduled to be unwound: Connor Lassiter, Risa Ward, and Levi "Lev" Jedediah Calder.

Connor is a sixteen-year-old delinquent who discovers his parents signed an order to get him unwound. When his attempt at running away gets him cornered by a Juvey-cop, a law-enforcement officer who serves to round up teenagers signed to be unwound, he holds another teenager hostage, shoots the cop with his own tranquilizer gun, and causes a massive pile up. Connor's action gave him the name "Akron AWOL" and earns him the reputation of being the runaway who took down a police officer. At the same time, Risa, a fifteen-year-old orphan on her way to becoming unwound in order to cut her orphanage's costs, uses the jam to escape from the bus she was traveling on. Lev, a thirteen-year-old who was raised to believe it was his duty to be a "tithe" (chosen member to be unwound as an act of charity or service to a religion) for his family, is also on his way to be unwound and is the teenager who was held hostage. He is then abducted after being tranquilized. Connor and Risa escape the scene with Lev being forced to follow.

Connor picks up a storked newborn girl after remembering a past experience his family had with storking. Risa grudgingly agrees to take the baby in with the group after they are caught holding her. The three enter a nearby high school to hide, and Lev attempts to escape by turning himself and the other two in to the school authorities. Feeling guilty about his actions, Lev decides to escape and pulls the fire alarm to help the other two escape as the police begin to arrive. Risa and Connor are found by a school teacher named Hannah, who helps them escape and tells them to find an antique store owner named Sonia. Sonia runs a safe house for runaway teenagers signed to be unwound. There, Connor and Risa meet Hayden Upchurch, a teen whose parents decided to have him unwound rather than choose who can have custody over him; Mai, a girl whose parents signed her due to the excess of girls in her family; Zachary, who is nicknamed "Mouth Breather" due to his asthma; and Roland Taggart, a bully with a tiger shark tattoo. Before the group is to be shuttled to the next safe house, Sonia has each teenager write a letter to someone they love. The letters would be sent a year after their eighteenth birthday if they were not picked up. Hannah decides to adopt the newborn girl, and the group was sent to a warehouse that serves as another safe house.

Meanwhile, Lev encounters another teenager named Cyrus "CyFi" Finch, who teaches Lev street smarts. Lev learns that CyFi struggles to find closure with his actions, which has caused him to run away and engage in delinquent activities such as stealing. The struggle comes from Tyler Walker, an unwound teenager who has part of his brain in CyFi and is unaware that he has been unwound. As a result, CyFi constantly engages in Tyler's old habits and experiences Tyler's emotions sporadically. Lev helps CyFi and Tyler find peace by allowing Tyler to speak to his parents once again through CyFi, with Cyrus dubbing himself Cy-Ty as a way to represent both him and Tyler.

Risa and Connor realize Roland manipulates, lies, and uses fear as a means to get what he wants and create chaos.  The two teens get sent to a large warehouse, full of other unwinds as a final stop on their journey.  Here, they see about 60 other kids who we also being shuffled between safe homes.  The teens are forming friendships and Roland is falling into a place of power.  Roland and Connor become enemies, due to Connor also having power.  One day, Roland attempts to rape Risa in the bathroom, hoping to set off Connor.  His attempt fails, and Connor continues to not fight him. The group of teenagers eventually make it to "The Graveyard," an airplane graveyard run by "The Admiral," a former admiral known as Admiral Dunfee. There, teenagers are taught skills and put to work until they turn eighteen or need to be transported elsewhere. Roland, with a new motive to become the new leader, spreads rumors in order to make the teenagers at The Graveyard turn against The Admiral. Connor confronts The Admiral and discovers that the rumors about him are false. The Admiral explains he had his own son unwound out of expectation and created The Graveyard as a way to make up for that mistake. The Graveyard is also acknowledged by the government as a compromise to keep runaways off the streets while allowing them to not be unwound. Connor and Risa decide to side with The Admiral, with Connor serving as his spy. Suspicions against The Admiral's motives led to the death of "The Goldens," a group of five teenagers who help The Admiral run The Graveyard, and Connor suspects Roland to be responsible. Lev arrives at The Graveyard and reunites with Connor and Risa. However, Lev decides to join a secret group within The Graveyard dedicated to destroying Unwinding facilities, known as harvest camps, rather than work in The Graveyard until he is eighteen. Lev becomes a "clapper", a suicide bomber injected with liquid explosive that can be detonated by clapping, alongside Mai and another runaway named Blaine.

A riot ensues when the bodies of The Goldens are discovered, and The Admiral has a heart attack during the resulting chaos. Connor eventually calms the riot down and forces Roland to help him fly The Admiral to the hospital. Risa joins them, and all three teenagers are arrested and taken away to a harvest camp. Risa is forced to play in the harvest camp's band and plays for every teenager about to undergo the procedure. Connor's reputation as Akron AWOL causes the staff to treat him with disrespect and contempt. Lev enters the harvest camp as a tithe, ready to detonate the harvest camp. However, he discovers Connor is also at the camp, and the time planned to self detonate is when Connor will be unwound. He attempts to stop Mai and Blaine, who also came to the camp, but is too late. Roland is unwound first due to his blood type, and the staff prepare to take Connor. The clappers detonate themselves as Connor is about to enter the procedure room. The explosion causes the building Risa and the band were on collapse, and Connor is knocked unconscious as well. The explosion causes chaos as the building begins to collapse. Lev, initially willing to clap, backs out and helps the survivors escape before turning himself in to the police.

Connor wakes up in the hospital, and a nurse saves him from being unwound by purposely misidentifying him as a young Juvey-cop killed in the explosion. Connor ends up with a new eye and arm against his will and learns that the arm came from Roland's body. 

Risa ends up being paralyzed from the hip down and will need to use a wheelchair. She refuses treatment, exploiting the loophole that people with disabilities could not be unwound. Connor and Risa reunite and continue their relationship from their time at The Graveyard.

Lev, because he was a clapper, is also excluded from becoming unwound. The liquid explosive damaged his organs, making them unsuitable for transplantation. His family refuses to take him back, and his older brother Marcus, who spoke out against having Lev being unwound as a tithe in the beginning, is willing to take custody of him.

The Admiral, weak from the heart attack, refuses to receive an unwound heart and resigns from his position at The Graveyard. During his career, The Admiral used his status to find where his son's body parts are being used. The Admiral manages to contact most of the people who ended up with one of his son's parts and organizes a reunion at his home. Connor and Risa return to The Graveyard, with Connor being the new leader and vowing to fight against unwinding.

Characters
Connor Lassiter (the "Akron AWOL") is a sixteen-year-old teenager whose parents signed the unwind order due to his delinquent behavior. His escape and shooting of a Juvey Cop with a tranquilizer gun earned him the nickname "Akron AWOL," with stories that continue to become more elaborate with each telling. Throughout the story, Connor changes from being an uncontrolled fighter to a person who rationalizes and contain his rage when necessary. Connor eventually develops a relationship with Risa and befriends Lev despite their initial meeting. Alongside Risa, Connor sides with the Admiral during their stay at The Graveyard and even takes the Admiral to the hospital despite knowing that he will be turned to authorities to be unwound. Connor takes over as the new leader at the end of the novel. He served as a mechanic during his stay at The Graveyard.
Risa Ward is a fifteen-year-old teenage resident at a state home orphanage in Ohio and was scheduled to be unwound to cut orphanage costs. Extremely smart, resourceful, and tough, Risa's skills help Connor and Lev survive and get out of many sticky situations. Her skills with healing and taking care of children allows her to work as the chief medic at the Graveyard, and her piano skills forces her to be a part of the band at the harvest camp when she was turned in. At the end of the book, Risa is paralyzed by the explosions and refuses treatment in order to not be unwound and because she doesn't want to have a new spine from an Unwind. She rekindles her relationship with Connor and joins him at The Graveyard when he became the new leader.
Levi "Lev" Jedediah Calder is a teenage tithe chosen by his family to be unwound as a religious sacrifice. Initially willing to serve his duty, his experience with Connor helped change his mind about his purpose in life. Lev, being raised in a religious and seemingly loving family, begins to show resentment towards his parents as the story continues. Despite his rocky start with Connor, he eventually befriends him and Risa. He overcomes his sheltered lifestyle with the help of CyFi's teachings, which led him to become a clapper. However, he refuses to clap and gains national attention as "the clapper who didn't clap" after his arrest. 
Cyrus "CyFi" Finch is a fifteen-year-old teenager who befriends Lev after Lev is separated from Risa and Connor. CyFi teaches Lev street smarts and Lev helps CyFi gain closure due to his temporal lobe belonging to an unwound teenager named Tyler Walker. CyFi identifies as an Umber (a term used by the book to define black people). 
Admiral Dunfee "the Admiral" is a man who used to work for what remained of the United States Navy during the Heartland War. As a way to make up for unwinding his son, he creates The Graveyard to provide runaway teenagers a safe haven in an airplane junkyard. After a heart attack and his refusal to take a new heart from an unwound teenager, the Admiral resigns his position as leader of the Graveyard and gives the role to Connor. His action of unwinding his son led to the urban legend of "Humphrey Dunfee". 
Roland Taggart is a violent teenager Connor and Risa encounter. Roland serves as a foil to Connor, clashing with him whenever he could and nearly kills him when he discovers Connor is the Akron AWOL. Roland ends up being unwound before the explosion, and Connor ends up receiving his arm and eye. A malicious and manipulative character, Roland stops at nothing to create chaos or gain power. Through Roland's procedure, the process of unwinding is revealed. 
Hayden Upchurch is one of the teenagers in Sonia's basement. Philosophical and sarcastic, he becomes friends with Connor during their time at the Graveyard. Hayden works in food distribution and eventually works in communications when Connor becomes the new leader. Connor entrusts him to take charge of the camp near the climax while Connor goes to deal with more trivial manners.
Sonia is an older lady that runs an antique shop that is secretly a safe house for runaways. Connor and Risa were told by schoolteacher Hannah to go to her for help, and she leads them down to the basement before they are to be taken to another location. Sonia makes the runaways write a letter to their parents and holds onto them until a year after they turn eighteen. If they do not arrive to take their letters by then, she will send them out to their parents.
Diego The fourth boy from the plane crate that Connor, Hayden and Emby were shoved into (Chapter 27)

Development
Shusterman says that the idea for Unwind came to him from three separate news articles. The first was from a scientist that claimed that "within our lifetime, 100% of the human body will be viable for transplant" without rejections. The second was a report on teenagers residing in Britain labeled as "feral" and how some opinions on those teenagers include an indifference in having them killed for the sake of society. The last  was an article studying the trends of voting in America and the number one topic that determine's a candidate's vote is the voter's view on abortion.

Shusterman explains that Unwind is a novel that imagines not a technological future, but a sociological future. There are mentions of slightly more advanced technology than today, such as advanced holograms and pigment injections to cosmetically change eye colors, but much of the novel is set to be a near future of America.

Film adaptation
In 2010, the film rights to Unwind were sold to Tasty Films and Contagion Film. Casting has yet to begin, but as of April 15, 2012, the film has moved into the early stages of pre-production. Novel-author Neal Shusterman drafted the screenplay. On December 9, 2012, The Hollywood Reporter reported that Constantin Film had picked up the film rights to the whole series. In January 2020, Shusterman announced that production of the film was not going well but that there would be a television series.

Critical reception
The New York Times reviewer Ned Vizzini gave an approving review, claiming that "the power of the novel lies in what it doesn't do: come down explicitly on one side or the other."
VOYA also gave a positive review: "The novel follows three protagonists who are attempting to 'kick-AWOL' and survive to eighteen to escape their unwindings: Connor, the rebellious teen; Risa, a ward of the state being unwound because of budget cuts; and Lev, a tithe born as an unwind sacrifice. The novel asks two questions: When does a life have value? Who determines whether it is worth keeping? Unfortunately, who is unwound and who gets which 'parts' is often determined by socio-economic status. In addition, parents seem to shamelessly unwind their children for typical teen frustration and rebellion. Betrayal by parents and the system is a horrifying truth for the protagonists. As such, there are many passages that are difficult to read either for their heartrending nature or their shocking specifics, particularly the detailed 'harvest' of a well-known character. Poignant, compelling, and ultimately terrifying, this book will enjoy popularity with a wide range of readers beyond its science-fiction base."
The School Library Journal gave Unwind a STARRED REVIEW: "...There is evenhanded, thoughtful treatment of many issues, including when life starts and stops, consciousness, religion, free will, law, trust and betrayal, suicide bombers, and hope. Initially, the premise of parents dismantling their children is hard to accept; however, readers are quickly drawn into the story, which is told in a gripping, omniscient voice. Characters live and breathe; they are fully realized and complex, sometimes making wrenchingly difficult decisions. This is a thought-provoking, well-paced read that will appeal widely, especially to readers who enjoy Scott Westerfeld's Uglies (2005)..."
TeensReadToo.com also provided a favorable review: "In his chilling new novel, Neal Shusterman paints a picture of a world where there aren't any cures and doctors, just surgeons and replacements. Three unwanted teenagers face a fate worse than death—unwinding. Their bodies will be cut up, and every part of them used, from their brains to their toes. But if they can stay out of the authorities' clutches until the age of eighteen, they just might survive.... The most frightening science fiction novels are always the ones that are most similar to our world. Shusterman doesn't fail to describe how a wrong solution to a modern issue can affect generations to come. Thought provoking, terrifying, and almost inconceivable, UNWIND will keep you reading late into the night."

Sequels
Unwind is the first book in a four-book series. A sequel, entitled UnWholly, was released on August 26, 2012. A third installment, titled UnSouled, was released on October 15, 2013. The last book is Undivided and was published on October 14, 2014.

A novella entitled UnStrung, written by Neal Shusterman and Michelle Knowlden, was released on July 24, 2012. UnStrung is a companion story, set within Unwind and follows the events that led Lev to become a clapper.  The story picks up shortly after Lev and CyFi part ways, as he finds himself on a Native American (or ChanceFolk) reservation.  UnStrung was later collected in UnBound, a collection of short stories and novellas, which was released on December 15, 2015. The author says that this might be one of his most favorite books to write.

References

External links
 About Neal Shusterman
 Neal Shusterman's Official Website
 Neal Shusterman's Blog
 Unwind Movie Production Site
 Unwind Movie Production Blog
 Other Books by Neal Shusterman

American novels adapted into films
American science fiction novels
American young adult novels
Biopunk novels
Children's science fiction novels
Dystopian novels
Organ transplantation in fiction
Novels about abortion
Abortion in fiction